Johan Richard "Jussi" Kivimäki (5 February 1885 – in absentia 1 January 1976) was a Finnish wrestler, who competed at the 1908 Summer Olympics.

Sports 
He won the Helsinki championship belt in 1907 and 1908.

He participated the men's Greco-Roman light heavyweight event at the 1908 Olympics, where he was eliminated in his first match by Dutch Jacob van Westrop, tying for the 9th place.

At the unofficial 1909 European Wrestling Championships he placed 6th in the 82.5+ kg Greco-Roman event.

Later he became a professional.

Death 
He was declared dead in absentia on 15 December 1976, with death date set to 1 January 1976.

See also
List of people who disappeared

References

External links
 

1885 births
1970s missing person cases
20th-century deaths
Finnish male sport wrestlers
Missing people
Missing person cases in Finland
Olympic wrestlers of Finland
People declared dead in absentia
People from Häme Province (Grand Duchy of Finland)
Wrestlers at the 1908 Summer Olympics